Stenotsivoka is a genus of beetles in the family Cerambycidae, containing the following species:

 Stenotsivoka latipes Adlbauer, 2001
 Stenotsivoka negrei Vives, 2004
 Stenotsivoka remipes (Fairmaire, 1902)

References

Dorcasominae